Shahrak-e Shahid Mohammad Hasan Ahmadi (also Romanized as Shahrak-e Shahīd Moḩammad Ḩasan Aḩmadī) is a village in Ahudasht Rural District, Shavur District, Shush County, Khuzestan Province, Iran. At the 2006 census, its population was 42, in 9 families.

References 

Populated places in Shush County